Tripchlorolide is an isolate of Tripterygium wilfordii (雷公藤) that has potential interaction with the NMDA receptor.

References

Diterpenes
Organochlorides
Lactones
Epoxides